Nuestra Belleza Nayarit 2015 was the 22nd edition of Nuestra Belleza Nayarit. This year there were 10 delatares from around the state of Nayarit competing for the state title. Geraldine Ponce from Xalisco won the title. By winning this pageant she had the opportunity to represent the state of Nayarit at the national pageant, Nuestra Belleza México 2016. She obtained the title of 2nd runner-up nationally. Later in the year the director of Nuestra Belleza México, Lupita Jones, designated her to represent Mexico in Miss International 2016 in Tokyo, Japan where she made it to the top 15.

Results

Nuestra Belleza Nayarit 2015
Pre-arrival predictions

Contestants

References

Nuestra Belleza México
2015 beauty pageants